The 2012 Tokyo Verdy season sees Tokyo Verdy compete in J.League Division 2 for the fourth consecutive season and 12th second-tier season overall since 1972. Tokyo Verdy are also competing in the 2012 Emperor's Cup.

Players

Competitions

J. League

League table

Matches

Emperor's Cup

References

Tokyo Verdy
Tokyo Verdy seasons